Sejnane  is a town and commune in the Bizerte Governorate, Tunisia. As of 2004 it had a population of 4737.

See also
List of cities in Tunisia

References

Populated places in Bizerte Governorate
Communes of Tunisia
Tunisia geography articles needing translation from French Wikipedia